Liberazione was an Italian left-wing newspaper that was in circulation between 1991 and 2012. It was published online in the period 2012–2014. The paper was based in Rome, Italy, and was the official newspaper of the Italian Communist Refoundation Party.

History and profile
The paper was founded in 1991 as the official newspaper of the Communist Refoundation Party.

A satirical magazine, Frigidaire, became the supplement of the paper on 25 April 2009. 

In 2011 the circulation of Liberazione was about 11,000 copies. In January 2012 the print edition folded, and the paper became online-only publication. The online edition of the newspaper was also closed on 19 March 2014.

References

1991 establishments in Italy
2012 disestablishments in Italy
Communism in Italy
Communist newspapers
Communist Refoundation Party
Daily newspapers published in Italy
Defunct newspapers published in Italy
Defunct weekly newspapers
Italian-language newspapers
Newspapers published in Rome
Publications established in 1991
Publications disestablished in 2012
Weekly newspapers published in Italy
Online newspapers with defunct print editions